Grand Tower is a city in Jackson County, Illinois, United States. The population was 605 at the 2010 census.  The town gets its name from Tower Rock, a landmark island in the Mississippi River.

History 
Former names of this town include La Tour ("The Tower"), Jenkins Landing, Cochran's Woodyard Landing, and Evans' Landing.

The earliest inhabitants were a band of river pirates, who settled here after being driven off Spanish soil west of the Mississippi River, near the pirate ambush spot of Tower Rock. This outlaw settlement was destroyed by the United States Army dragoons in 1803. A subsequent settler was a man named Walker, who is the namesake of Walker Hill.

Severe flooding struck the town in 1947.

Geography
Grand Tower is located in southwestern Jackson County at  (37.632599, -89.501944). The city is bordered to the west by the Mississippi River, which forms the Missouri–Illinois boundary. The northern edge of the city borders Shawnee National Forest.

Illinois Route 3 runs through an eastern extension of the city limits, leading north (upriver)  to Chester, where the Chester Bridge crosses the Mississippi, and south  to Illinois Route 146, which crosses the Mississippi to Cape Girardeau, Missouri. There are no other road bridges over the Mississippi closer to Grand Tower.

Immediately to the south of the city is a small portion of Perry County, Missouri, which is known as "Grand Tower Island".  The island's sole road connection terminates in Grand Tower.  The Grand Tower Pipeline Bridge connects a natural gas pipeline across the Mississippi River between Wittenberg, Missouri and Grand Tower.

Economy
The Grand Tower Energy Center is a 478 megawatt combined cycle gas-fired facility which produces power for the region. It is owned by Ameren Energy Generating Company, or Genco.

Community

Shawnee Elementary School, North - Once a public school, now (since 2015) a private residence.

A local post office with zip code 62942 provides mail service. Four churches, the First United Presbyterian Church, the Grand Tower United Methodist Church, First Baptist Church, and Light House Christian Assembly Church offer religious services. A work of levees protects the community from flooding when the Mississippi River water levels rise. The Devil's Backbone Park, named after a limestone ridge which created a natural bottleneck in the Mississippi River, provided easy opportunity for river pirates to attack keelboats and barges. This park provides RV camping, playgrounds, picnic facilities, and a shower house.

Demographics

As of the census of 2000, there were 624 people, 268 households, and 169 families residing in the city. The racial makeup of the city was 98.24% White, 0.16% African American, 0.32% Native American, 0.64% from other races, and 0.64% from two or more races. Hispanic or Latino of any race were 0.96% of the population.

There were 268 households, out of which 32.1% had children under the age of 18 living with them, 49.3% were married couples living together, 8.6% had a female householder with no husband present, and 36.9% were non-families. 33.6% of all households were made up of individuals, and 16.8% had someone living alone who was 65 years of age or older.  The average household size was 2.33 and the average family size was 2.99.

In the city, the population was spread out, with 26.1% under the age of 18, 8.5% from 18 to 24, 27.2% from 25 to 44, 22.8% from 45 to 64, and 15.4% who were 65 years of age or older.  The median age was 39 years. For every 100 females, there were 95.0 males.  For every 100 females age 18 and over, there were 91.3 males.

The median income for a household in the city was $27,135, and the median income for a family was $40,000. Males had a median income of $34,375 versus $23,750 for females. The per capita income for the city was $14,525.  About 11.3% of families and 20.9% of the population were below the poverty line, including 29.4% of those under age 18 and 16.1% of those age 65 or over.

Notable people
 Christine Brewer, opera singer
 Ike Morgan, illustrator

Popular culture
 The novel The River Between Us, written by Richard Peck, was set in Grand Tower.

Gallery

References

External links
History of Grand Tower
Grand Tower, Illinois History
The Devil's Backbone & Bake Oven (Grand Tower, Illinois) at prairieghosts.com

Cities in Illinois
Illinois populated places on the Mississippi River
Cities in Jackson County, Illinois